Corydoras longipinnis is a species of tropical freshwater fish in the family Callichthyidae. It originates in inland waters in South America. Corydoras longipinnis is found in the Río Dulce in Argentina.

References

 *Knaack, J., 2007. Beiträge zur Kenntnis der Callichthyidae (Teleostei: Siluriformes). III. Corydoras longipinnis sp. n. - ein neuer Panzerwels aus dem río Dulce in Argentinien (Teleostei: Siluriformes: Callichthyidae). Vertebr. Zool. 57(1):35-55.  

Corydoras
Catfish of South America
Fish of Argentina
Taxa named by Joachim Knaack
Fish described in 2007